Athanasios Papadopoulos-Kerameus (1856–1912) was an Ottoman Greek scholar of Greek Orthodox religious affiliation. He was an Ottoman and subsequently Tsarist subject.

Appointed secretary of the Greek Literary Club of Constantinople (1881) he was made responsible (1883) for creating an inventory of Greek manuscripts belonging to schools, churches and monasteries. In 1887 he was summoned to Jerusalem to collect and catalogue all manuscripts in Palestine. The Russian Imperial Orthodox Society for Palestine charged him with the task of editing unpublished texts. In 1892 he became a private lecturer (Privatdozent) in Modern Greek and Byzantine History at St. Petersburg University. He was subsequently director of the theological section of the St. Petersburg Imperial Library.

Principal publications
 Hierosolymitike Bibliotheke, (catalogue of the Jerusalem patriarchal libraries) vol.1, St. Petersburg, 1891
 Analekta Hierosolymitikes Stachyologias (edition of mainly unpublished Greek texts), 5 vols.,1891; anastatic impression, Brussels, 1963

Sources
 B. Joassart, Analecta Bollandiana, Tome 128, Brussels, 2010

1856 births
1912 deaths
Greek scholars
People from Agria